Boxcar Sessions is the debut studio album from American hip hop artist Saafir, released on May 10, 1994 on Qwest Records.

Release and reception

Alex Henderson of Allmusic compared Saafir's musical style favorably to such celebrated hip hop artists as A Tribe Called Quest, De La Soul, Digable Planets, and the Pharcyde. Henderson also stated "between Saafir's rapping style and the jazzy production, Boxcar Sessions is fairly fresh sounding."

Track listing

Personnel
Information taken from Allmusic.
art direction – Kevin Hosmann
engineering – Crayge Lindesay
executive production – Saafir, Sleuth
mastering – Brian Gardner
mixing – Big Nose, J Groove, Jay-Z, Rashinel, Saafir
photography – Victor Hall
production – Big Nose, J Groove, Jay-Z, Saafir, Sleuth

Notes

External links
 
 Boxcar Sessions at Discogs

1994 debut albums
Qwest Records albums
Saafir albums